Protochiton is an extinct genus of polyplacophoran molluscs. Protochiton became extinct during the Eocene period.

References 

Prehistoric chiton genera